Novastoa is a genus of sea snails, marine gastropod molluscs in the family Vermetidae, the worm snails.

Species
Species within the genus Novastoa include:
 Novastoa lamellosa (Hutton, 1873)

References

 Powell A. W. B., New Zealand Mollusca, William Collins Publishers Ltd, Auckland, New Zealand 1979 

Vermetidae
Taxa named by Harold John Finlay